Giorgi Seturidze (born 8 April 1985) is a Georgian footballer who plays in Germany for fifth-tier club FC Einheit Rudolstadt.

References

1985 births
Footballers from Tbilisi
Living people

Footballers from Georgia (country)
Georgia (country) international footballers
Association football midfielders
FC Lokomotivi Tbilisi players
FC Dinamo Batumi players
FC Metalurgi Rustavi players
FC Carl Zeiss Jena players
FK Standard Sumgayit players
Kapaz PFK players
FC Torpedo Kutaisi players
FC Dinamo Tbilisi players
FC Dila Gori players
FC Einheit Rudolstadt players
2. Bundesliga players
Erovnuli Liga players
Azerbaijan Premier League players
Oberliga (football) players
Expatriate footballers from Georgia (country)
Expatriate footballers in Germany
Expatriate sportspeople from Georgia (country) in Germany
Expatriate footballers in Azerbaijan
Expatriate sportspeople from Georgia (country) in Azerbaijan